Taeniodonta ("banded teeth") is an extinct early group of cimolestid mammals known from the Maastrichtian to the Eocene. Taeniodonts evolved quickly into highly specialized digging animals, and varied greatly in size, from rat-sized to species as large as a bear.  Later species developed prominent front teeth and huge claws for digging and rooting. Some genera, like Stylinodon, had ever-growing teeth.

Two families belong to this  group, Stylinodontidae and Conoryctidae. They were endemic to North America. The scarcity of taeniodont fossils can be explained by the fact that these animals probably lived in dry or arid climates unconductive to fossilization. Taeniodonts are unambiguously Eutherians, and part of Cimolesta; Cimolestes is the immediate outgroup to Taeniodonta.

Taxonomy and phylogeny
From Thomas E. Williamson and Stephen L. Brusatte (2013):
 Order Cimolesta
 Suborder Taeniodonta
Alveugena
Schowalteria
 Onychodectes
 Family Conoryctidae
 Conoryctella
 Huerfanodon
 Conoryctes
 Family Stylinodontidae
  Chungchienia
 Wortmania
 Psittacotherium
 Ectoganus
 Stylinodon

Notes

References

 
 
 

Cimolestans
Paleocene mammals
Eocene mammals
Priabonian extinctions
Prehistoric mammals of North America
Clawed herbivores
Maastrichtian first appearances